George Cooper (May 14, 1840, New York City – September 26, 1927, New York City) was an American poet remembered chiefly for his song lyrics, many set to music by Stephen Foster.

He translated the lyrics of German, Russian, Italian, Spanish, and French musical works into singable English.


Works
 "For the Dear Old Flag, I Die"
 "Only One Mother"
 "The Wind and the Leaves"
 "An Autumn Greeting"
 "Star of the East" (1890)
 Words for the 1869 song Sweet Genevieve, to music by Henry L Tucker
"October’s Party"  Memorized by third grade students in the 1950s

Further reading
"Author of 'Sweet Genevieve' Dies in His Sleep at Age of 89" (facsimile), The New York Times, September 28, 1927

References

External links

Musical works with text/translation by George Cooper at IMSLP

1840 births
1927 deaths
Writers from New York City
Poets from New York (state)
Translators to English
American translators
American male poets